The Sea Wolf is a 1993 American-Canadian made-for-television adventure drama film directed by Michael Anderson, starring Charles Bronson, Catherine Mary Stewart and Christopher Reeve. It is based on Jack London's 1904 novel The Sea-Wolf.

The film was nominated for Outstanding Music Composition for a Miniseries, Movie, or a Special at the 45th Primetime Emmy Awards.

Plot
Jack London's brutal Wolf Larson brings a shipwrecked aristocrat and a con woman aboard his doomed ship, the Ghost.

Cast

Reception

Critical response
Ray Loynd wrote for the Los Angeles Times:
The production rivals the classic Edward G. Robinson remake (Warner Bros., 1942), generally cited as the strongest of all six prior "Sea Wolf" movies (including three silents). ... Bronson, playing what's probably his first thinking man's heavy, seems right at home as the power-maddened Wolf Larsen butting heads and spouting lines from Milton ("It's better to reign in hell than to serve in heaven"). But it's Reeve's character, compelled to claw his way out of the galley as the spat-upon cabin boy, who does all the changing in this sea-tossed crucible of fire.

References

External links

1993 television films
1993 films
1990s adventure drama films
American television films
Canadian drama television films
American adventure drama films
Canadian adventure drama films
English-language Canadian films
Films directed by Michael Anderson
Sea adventure films
Films based on The Sea-Wolf
Television shows based on works by Jack London
1990s American films
1990s Canadian films